Unieux is a commune in the Loire department in central France.

Unieux is located within a larger metropolitan area, yet is surrounded by delightful and varied countryside.

In recent years, the council of Unieux has made great efforts to improve and modernize the communications infrastructure. This has included road and transport improvements, and the addition of a sophisticated multimedia library that enables the citizens of Unieux to keep in touch with the world beyond Unieux.

Population

Transportation
Transport is primarily by road. But one can take the train from Gare de Saint-Étienne-Châteaucreux, so long as one is prepared to travel the 12 km between Unieux and Saint-Étienne.

See also
Communes of the Loire department

References

Communes of Loire (department)